Nikolayevsk is  a town in Volgograd Oblast, Russia.

Nikolayevsk or Nikolaevsk may also refer to:
Nikolayevsk Urban Settlement, a municipal formation which the town of district significance of Nikolayevsk in Nikolayevsky District of Volgograd Oblast, Russia is incorporated as
Nikolaevsk, Alaska, a town in Alaska, United States
Nikolayevsk-on-Amur, a town in Khabarovsk Krai, Russia

See also
Nikolayevsky (disambiguation)
Nikolayev (disambiguation)
Nikolayevka (disambiguation)